Miscou Lighthouse can refer to:
 The Miscou Island Lighthouse, centre of Miscou Provincial Park
 Miscou Lighthouse, a community near the lighthouse